Dry Ridge is a census-designated place (CDP) in Colerain Township, Hamilton County, Ohio, United States. The population was 2,698 at the 2020 census.

Geography
Interstate 275 forms the southeastern edge of the CDP, and Colerain Avenue (U.S. Route 27) forms the eastern edge. Dry Ridge Road runs east–west through the CDP, which extends west to the Great Miami River.

References

Census-designated places in Hamilton County, Ohio
Census-designated places in Ohio